Gallacher is a surname of [Scotland|Scottish]] origin and is a variant of the Gaelic Ó Gallchóbhair found chiefly in Scotland. The name Ó Gallchóbhair has been variously anglicised as Gallagher, Gallaher, Gallaugher, Goligher etc.

Notable people with the surname include:

Brian Gallacher, Scottish footballer
Bernard Gallacher, Scottish golfer 
Frank Gallacher, Scottish-Australian actor
Hughie Gallacher, Scottish international footballer (Airdrieonians, Newcastle United)
Jim Gallacher, Scottish football goalkeeper (Clydebank)
Kevin Gallacher, Scottish football player and TV sports pundit
Kirsty Gallacher, Scottish television presenter often specialising in sport programmes
Liz Gallacher, British film music supervisor
Mike Gallacher, Australian politician
Pat Gallacher, Scottish footballer (Partick Thistle, Tottenham Hotspur, Luton Town)
Pat Gallacher (footballer, born 1913) (1913–1983), Scottish footballer
Patrick Gallacher,"Patsy", Scottish international footballer (Sunderland, Stoke City, Scotland)
Patsy Gallacher, Irish footballer (Celtic)
Paul Gallacher, Scottish international football goalkeeper (Dundee United, Norwich City, Dunfermline Athletic, St Mirren, Partick Thistle)
Skeets Gallacher (1925–2013), Scottish boxer
Stephen Gallacher, Scottish golfer
Stirling Gallacher, English TV and stage actress
Tom Gallacher, Scottish playwright
Tommy Gallacher (1922–2001), Scottish footballer (Dundee)
Willie Gallacher, Scottish trade unionist, activist and communist

See also
Gallagher (surname)

Surnames of Irish origin